Fernaldella fimetaria, the green broomweed looper, is a species of geometrid moth in the family Geometridae. The species was first described by Grote and Robinson in 1870  It is found in Central and North America.

The MONA or Hodges number for Fernaldella fimetaria is 6420.

References

Further reading

External links

 

Macariini
Articles created by Qbugbot
Moths described in 1870